David Sviben (born 30 September 1989) is a Slovenian football midfielder, who plays for NK Primorje in Slovenian PrvaLiga.

Honours 
 Slovenian Youth league runner up 2007/08

References

Slovenian footballers
1989 births
Living people
Footballers from Ljubljana
Association football midfielders
NK Domžale players
NK Radomlje players
NK Primorje players